This is a list of members of the Tasmanian House of Assembly between the 30 April 1909 election and the 30 April 1912 election.

A redistribution in 1907 resulted in the abolition of all of the single-member seats and the adoption of the five federal electorates which had been created for Tasmania, and used the Hare-Clark proportional representation system to elect six members to each of the seats. The 1909 election was the point at which these changes took effect.

One major result was the formation of parties—prior to 1909, members other than those pledged to the Labor Party had adopted loose and flexible affiliations, generally being known as "Ministerialist", "Oppositionist/Liberal" or "Independent". A coalition of former Ministerialists, Independents and Liberals formed the Anti-Socialist Party (which became the Liberal Party of Tasmania in 1912), while another group of Oppositionists formed the Liberal Democrat Party.

The second major result was the product of the election itself—the near-complete destruction of the former Liberal grouping which had originally formed around Sir Edward Braddon and Andrew Inglis Clark, and the considerable rise in the fortunes of the Labor Party. They gained 12 seats in the new Assembly, and for the first time in Tasmania's history, held government for a week in October 1909 under Premier John Earle.

Notes
  On 28 February 1910, Darwin Labor MHA James Long resigned to contest a seat in the Australian Senate. Labor candidate James Hurst replaced him on 8 June 1910.
  On 25 February 1910, Wilmot Labor MHA Jens Jensen resigned to contest the Bass seat in the federal House of Representatives. Anti-Socialist candidate Edward Mulcahy replaced him on 8 June 1910.
  On 14 April 1911, Wilmot Anti-Socialist MHA John Hope resigned to contest the Legislative Council seat of Meander, which he won on 2 May 1911. Anti-Socialist candidate Herbert Hays replaced him on 8 June 1911.

Sources
 
 Parliament of Tasmania (2006). The Parliament of Tasmania from 1856

Members of Tasmanian parliaments by term
20th-century Australian politicians